Raul Soares de Figueiredo (22 January 1903 – 3 December 1941), known as Tamanqueiro, was Portuguese footballer who played as a midfielder.

Football career
During his short senior career, Tamanqueiro played for Académico do Porto, S.C. Olhanense and S.L. Benfica. He gained 17 caps for the Portugal national team.

Having made his debut on 17 May 1925, in a 0–2 defeat against Spain in Lisbon, Tamanqueiro appeared for the nation at the 1928 Summer Olympics.

References

External links

Portugal - Record International Players; at RSSSF

1903 births
1941 deaths
Footballers from Lisbon
Portuguese footballers
Association football midfielders
S.C. Olhanense players
S.L. Benfica footballers
Portugal international footballers
Olympic footballers of Portugal
Footballers at the 1928 Summer Olympics